Delaplaine High School was a middle school and senior high school in Delaplaine, Arkansas. It was initially controlled by the Delaplaine School District, which merged into the Greene County Tech School District on July 1, 2004. After the consolidation it was operated by the GCT school district and served students from the former Delaplaine School District boundary. It served Delaplaine and O'Kean, the latter since 1948 when the O'Kean district merged into the Delaplaine district.

The Delaplaine campus had a total of 245 students at the time of its closure. All seven members of the Greene County Tech board approved the closure due to the funds that came with the merger of the Delaplaine district drying up, financial issues, and more stringent Arkansas state standards.

The school, along with Delaplaine Elementary, closed in 2007. Delaplaine mayor Larry Myrick stated that the community lost children with families after the school stopped operations. 

Now all areas of the school district are assigned to Greene County Tech High School in Paragould.

References

External links
  - While it was a GCT school
 

Public high schools in Arkansas
Public middle schools in Arkansas
Schools in Greene County, Arkansas